False Dawn: The Delusions of Global Capitalism is a 1998 book by political philosopher John Gray that argues that free-market globalization is unstable and is in the process of collapsing.

A 2002 edition includes a foreword that relates the themes of False Dawn to the 11 September 2001 attacks and the new US military posture that led to the 2003 Invasion of Iraq. Gray notes how the economic shock therapy in post-Communist nations has resulted in "the resources of the vast Soviet war machine ... [being] sold to the highest bidder ... [including] non-state forces that were waging unconventional war ... [such as] terrorist networks." Also, the resource-scarcity from global industrialization is contributing to resource wars and a revival of The Great Game.

In chapter one, Gray groups together thinkers such as John Locke and Karl Marx on the basis of striving for an Enlightenment Utopia in which "a diversity of cultures ... [is] a stage to a universal civilization." Specific efforts to impose a "universal civilization" included Victorian-era England, the Soviet Union and, currently, the United States as "the last great power to base its policies on this enlightenment thesis", such as with the Washington Consensus.

See also
Classical liberalism
Neoliberalism
Multinational corporation
World on Fire (book)
Unequal Protection

Footnotes

False Dawn: The Delusions of Global Capitalism
False Dawn: The Delusions of Global Capitalism
Anti-globalization books
Books about capitalism
Books about multinational companies
Books about foreign relations of the United States
Futurology books
Political books